John Eichelberger (born September 1, 1958) of Blair Township, Pennsylvania is an American politician and former Pennsylvania State Senator.  He is a member of the Republican Party.  He represented the 30th district of the Pennsylvania State Senate.

Eichelberger gained notoriety following his defeat of Senate President Pro-Tempore Robert Jubelirer in the May 2006 primary election. In 2018, he ran to represent Pennsylvania's 13th congressional district in the U.S. House, though lost his party's nomination in the primary.

Biography
Prior to his career in government, Eichelberger was the President of an insurance brokerage in Altoona, Pennsylvania.  In 1995, he was elected to the Blair County Commission.  He was re-elected in 1999 and 2003. During his tenure as county commissioner, he was a major critic of local Congressman Bud Shuster, focusing on Shuster's "ethical clouds" in the later years of his tenure.  When Shuster resigned in February 2001, Eichelberger's name was floated as a possible successor. Instead, the Republican State Committee selected Shuster's son, Bill Shuster, to be the Republican nominee for the May 2001 special election. Bill Shuster won the committee's nomination after replacing 18 members of the Blair County, Pennsylvania Republican Committee with his own supporters.

2006 Election
His Senate campaign was sparked by the 2005 Pennsylvania pay raise.  Senate President Pro Tem Robert Jubelirer was a rival in Blair County politics who had supported the pay increase. His campaign was aided by conservative Bob Guzzardi.
Eichelberger attacked Jubelirer for his support of the raise as well as his stance on abortion.  During the campaign, Eichelberger received support from conservatives such as former congressman Pat Toomey and former Lieutenant Governor Bill Scranton.  Jubelirer counter-attacked, noting that Eichelberger had benefited from pay raises as a commissioner.  In addition, Jubelirer alleged that Eichelberger had a poor voting record on the commission.

On primary election day, Eichelberger took 44% to Jubelirer's 36% and C. Arnold McClure's 20%.  Jubelirer and David Brightbill were the first top-ranked General Assembly leaders to be defeated in a primary since 1964. Eichelberger went on to defeat businessman and Democratic candidate Greg Morris in the general election with 62.7% of the vote.

He was unopposed for re-election in 2010 and in 2014.

Electoral history

References

External links
State Senator John Eichelberger official website
I Like Eich official campaign website

1958 births
Living people
Republican Party Pennsylvania state senators
Politicians from Altoona, Pennsylvania
21st-century American politicians
Blair County Commissioners (Pennsylvania)